Jann (plural  or ) are the ancestor of the jinn in Islam-related beliefs. They are said to have inhabited the earth before Adam, ruled by a king called Jann ibn Jann. In folklore however, many consider them to be punished and turned into the weakest class of jinn, comparable to the way in which apes are seen as transformed humans. The father of the jinn is also called Abu Al-Jann.

Etymology and in the Quran
Jann from the Semitic root  is an Arabic term, whose primary meaning is "to hide" and can also refer to an agile snake. It is a neuter singular for jinn, while Jinni and Jinniyya(h) are either adjectives, or masculine and feminine singulars or both. In the Quran this term appears in Surah 15:27 and Surah 27:10 to designate a supernatural creature or a serpent. Many mufassirs regard jann as the ancestors of the jinn, in contrast the jinn applying to a wide range of supernatural creatures, and came later into existence. Some consider Jann to be the first of the jinn only, and likewise identify him with Iblis or Azazil, created from the fires of samum. However, the majority distinguishes between Iblis, the father of devils and Jann the father of jinn.

Canonical hadiths 
Sahih Muslim describes Al-Jann as being created out of a mixture of fire, contrasted with the angels created from light and humans created from clay-mud. Another hadith, mentioned in the collection of Al-Tirmidhi, reports that Muhammad sought refuge in God from Al-Jann, the father of jinn, until Surah Al-Nas and Surah Al-Falaq had been revealed.

Pre-Adamite Era 
In Persian Islamic legends, the world was ruled by Jann ibn Jann (Son of Jann), two thousand years before Adam was created. They were similar to humans in many ways and in many legends, God sent prophets to them, just as prophets were sent to humans. Jann ibn Jann offended the heavens, whereupon God sent Al-Harith (Iblis) with an army of angels to chastise him. But Jann ibn Jann refused to submit to the angels and a war ensued. At the end, Jann ibn Jann was overthrown by Al-Harith and the angels, who reigned the world onwards instead. Many Arabic legends regard the Pyramids of Giza as remains of the works done under the rule of Jann ibn Jann.

In Ibn Arabi's cosmology 
The Medieval Sunni mystic Ibn Arabi, famous for his teachings of Unity of Existence, describes Jann, the father of jinn, as the origin of animal power. Accordingly, God created Jann as the interior of human being, the animal soul hidden from the senses. Among the strongest powers of the animal power is the power of illusion, which is materialized in Satan, interpreted metaphorically as one of the descendants of Jann in Ibn Arabis' metaphysics.

See also 
 Dev (mythology)
 Tannin (monster)

References 

Jinn
Islamic terminology
Quranic figures